The Karelian Labor Commune (Karel´skaia Trudovaia Kommuna, KTK) was established in 1920 as an autonomous region following the successes of the  Red Army's incursion into the Republic of Uhtua on 18 May 1920. Edvard Gylling and Yrjö Sirola, former members of the government of the Finnish Socialist Workers' Republic, met with Lenin in the Kremlin to propose autonomy for Karelia within the Russian Soviet Federative Socialist Republic (. The KTK was founded on 8 June 1920.

Juridical status
The 1918 constitution of the RSFSR created provision for Labour Communes to be established within the territory of the RSFSR.

Concentration camps
The KTK was faced with a labour shortage which prevented them from effectively developing the economy through timber exports and industrialisation following the turmoil of the previous years. In a dispute with the Olonets Governorate, based in Petrozavodsk, Gylling attempted to gain control of the Neglinka saw mill, along with a nearby concentration camp run by the Cheka.

References

History of the Republic of Karelia